The white-bellied fantail (Rhipidura euryura) is a species of bird in the family Rhipiduridae.

It is endemic to Java. Its natural habitat is subtropical or tropical moist montane forests.

References

white-bellied fantail
Birds of Java
white-bellied fantail
Taxonomy articles created by Polbot